The Hoffman House, off U.S. Route 27 in Lincoln County, Kentucky between Lancaster and Stanford, was built around 1850. During the American Civil War the house "was the base of a large group of Confederates."

Listed on the National Register of Historic Places in 1983, it includes Greek Revival and Federal architecture.

References

National Register of Historic Places in Lincoln County, Kentucky
Federal architecture in Kentucky
Greek Revival architecture in Kentucky
Houses completed in 1850
Houses in Lincoln County, Kentucky
1850 establishments in Kentucky